Nobody Ordered Love is a lost 1972 British drama film directed by Robert Hartford-Davis and starring Ingrid Pitt, Judy Huxtable and Tony Selby.

Plot summary
After film director Paul Medbury attempts to replace Alice Allison, the alcoholic star of his new First World War movie entitled The Somme, with up-and-coming starlet Caroline Johnson, a series of tragic events begins to unfold.

Cast
 Ingrid Pitt – Alice Allison
 Judy Huxtable – Caroline Johnson
 John Ronane – Paul Medbury
 Peter Arne – Leo Richardstone
 Tony Selby – Peter Triman
 Mark Eden – Charles
 David Weston – Jacques Legrand
 John Glyn-Jones – Harry
 Janet Lynn – Valerie
 David Lodge – Sergeant
 Frank Jarvis – Corporal
 Barry Meteyard – Lieutenant
 Larry Taylor – Camera operator
 Heather Barbour – Janet
 Tricia Barnes – Continuity Girl
 Charles Houston – Assistant
 Carolyn Wilde – Virginia

Preservation status
This is now considered a lost film and is on the BFI 75 Most Wanted.

According to Ingrid Pitt, the film suffered such a fallout that Robert Hartford-Davis himself took the film out of circulation and relocated to the US. He would then order its destruction at his death in 1977.

No moving pictures remain, only black and white stills.

See also
 List of lost films

References

External links
 BFI 75 Most Wanted entry, with extensive notes
 

1972 films
British horror films
1972 horror films
Films about filmmaking
Films directed by Robert Hartford-Davis
Lost horror films
1970s lost films
Films shot at Pinewood Studios
Lost British films
1970s English-language films
1970s British films